Takeba is a Japanese surname.

People
Notable people with this surname include:
Lisa Takeba (born 1983), Japanese filmmaker
Taeko Takeba (born 1966), Japanese trap shooter

Fictional characters
Yukari Takeba, fictional character in the video game Persona 3

References

Japanese-language surnames